M. M. De Voe (born Milda Motekaitis) is an American author.

Biography
Her parents were born in Lithuania and live in Texas.  She lives in New York City with her husband and two children.

De Voe received her Master of Fine Arts from the Creative Writing program at Columbia University in May 2001 and her Bachelor of Arts from the College of Notre Dame of Maryland, magna cum laude, in 1990.

In 2013, De Voe founded Pen Parentis, a literary nonprofit organization that provides resources to authors who are also parents. The organization hosts an annual Writing Fellowship for New Parents and runs a popular reading series in Manhattan called the Pen Parentis Literary Salons, which is curated by Christina Chiu.

A member of both Equity and SAG/AFTRA, under the name Milda DeVoe, she appeared in many plays in New York City, including The Marriage of Bette and Boo, A Lie of the Mind, Baby with the Bathwater and The Heidi Chronicles (as the title role). She still does voiceover work in both Lithuanian and English, and is one of the Lithuanian voices of OnStar.

M. M. De Voe is a Manhattan-based fiction writer who has won awards and published short fiction in nearly every genre. She holds an MFA from Columbia University where she was a Writing Fellow and where she studied under Michael Cunningham, Helen Schulman, Joyce Johnson, and thesis advisor Matthew Sharpe. She won a fellowship to the 2008 St. Petersburg Summer Literary Seminars. The manuscript of her Columbia thesis won an honorable mention in Barbara Kingsolver's Bellwether Prize as well as an Arch and Bruce Brown Foundation Grant for gay-positive historical fiction.

De Voe was a member of the inaugural Lithuanian Writers of the Diaspora Forum, held in Vilnius, Lithuania in 2019.

Awards 
M. M. De Voe has won awards, mention, or been shortlisted for the following awards:

 Spring 2016 #AWPPoem Haiku Contest winner
 2014 #NYCPoetweet winner 
 2013 Bridport Prize (shortlisted: top 100 of 5800 entries)
 The Wake, five-word poetry contest (2012, winner)
 Carve Magazine Fiction contest (2011, short story, finalist)
 2010 NMW short-short fiction award (first prize, $500)
 The Campaign for Real Fear (2010, one of 20 winners)
 2009 Literal Latte Short-Short Fiction Contest (first prize, $1,000)
 2009 Wordstock Short Fiction Award (top ten anthologized)
 2008 Eric Hoffer Award for Best New Writing (short story, finalist)
 Sojourn's 2007 Editor's Choice Award (Work in Fiction, winner)
 Best of the First Line 2006 (short story, winner)
 The 2004 Dana Awards (unpublished novel, top ten shortlist)
 The 2004 Bellwether Prize (unpublished novel, honorable mention)
 Fish Publishing’s 2003 Short Story Prize (short list)
 H. E. Francis Short Story Competition 2002 (finalist)
 Phoebe’s 2001 Short Story Contest (second prize)
 PRISM: international 1999 Short Fiction Competition (honorable mention)
 nowCulture.com’s 1998 Annual Poetry Contest (second prize)
 The 1997 Raymond Carver Short Fiction Competition (second prize)
 The Lyric’s 1990 National Poetry Contest (first prize, $1,000)
 Additionally her fiction has been nominated for three Pushcart Prizes, as well as Best of the Net and Best of the Web short fiction prizes.

She won the inaugural Regina Russo Outstanding Recent Graduate Award from the University of Notre Dame of Maryland in June 1999, and won Sigma Tau Delta's Alpha-Alpha chapter's inaugural Distinguished Alumnae Award in 2014.

De Voe is also the recipient of the following fellowships and grants:

 2017 Creative Engagement Grant (for Pen Parentis Literary Salons) 
 2012 The Fund for Creative Communities (for her work with Pen Parentis)
 2009, 2010, 2011, 2012 Manhattan Community Arts Fund Grant (for her work with Pen Parentis)
 Arch and Bruce Brown Foundation Grants for Gay-Positive Historical Fiction 
 Fiction Fellowship: Summer Literary Seminars, St. Petersburg, Russia
 Columbia Writing Fellowship

References

External links 
 

20th-century American novelists
Living people
Columbia University School of the Arts alumni
Notre Dame of Maryland University alumni
21st-century American novelists
American stage actresses
Novelists from Texas
Writers from New York City
American women novelists
20th-century American women writers
21st-century American women writers
20th-century American short story writers
21st-century American short story writers
Novelists from New York (state)
Year of birth missing (living people)